This is a list of all the species of birds in the Order Casuariiformes.

Casuariidae

†Diogenornis
 †Diogenornis fragilis de Alvarenga 1983

†Hypselornis
 ?†Hypselornis sivalensis Lydekker 1891 (most likely a crocodilian)

Casuarius
 Casuarius bennetti Gould 1857 (Dwarf cassowary)
 C. b. westermanni (Sclater 1874) (Papuan dwarf cassowary)
 C. b. bennetti Gould 1857 (Bennett's cassowary)
 Casuarius casuarius (Linnaeus 1758) Brisson 1760 (Southern cassowary)
 Casuarius unappendiculatus Blyth 1860 (Northern cassowary)
  †Casuarius lydekkeri Rothschild 1911 (Pygmy cassowary)

Dromaius
 Dromaius novaehollandiae (Latham 1790) Vieillot 1816 (Emu)
 †D. n. ater Vieillot 1817 (King island emu)
 †D. n. baudinianus Parker 1984 (Kangaroo island emu)
 †D. n. diemenianus (Jennings 1827) (Tasmanian emu)
 D. n. diemenianus (Latham 1790) Vieillot 1816 (Mainland emu)
 †Dromaius ocypus Miller 1963

Emuarius (Emuaries)
 †Emuarius guljaruba Boles 2001
 †Emuarius gidju (Patterson & Rich 1987) Boles 1992

References

Lists of birds
Casuariiformes
Casuariformes